Presidential elections were held in Bangladesh on 5 September 2002, after the resignation of the previous president A. Q. M. Badruddoza Chowdhury. The Election Commission declared Iajuddin Ahmed as the President after nomination papers of two other candidates were found to be invalid. Iajuddin Ahmed took his oath as president on 6 September 2002.

References

External links
Iajuddin Ahmed Elected Unopposed – Gulfnews
Life Sketch of Iajuddin Ahmed

2002 elections in Bangladesh
Bangladesh
2002
2002 in Bangladesh